UNHCR Goodwill Ambassador is an official postnominal honorific title, title of authority, legal status and job description assigned to those goodwill ambassadors and advocates who are designated by the United Nations. UNHCR goodwill ambassadors are celebrity representatives of the Office of the UN High Commissioner for Refugees (UNHCR) who use their talent and fame to advocate for refugees.

Current UNHCR goodwill ambassadors
Current goodwill ambassadors and the year they were appointed:

Other positions
Barbara Hendricks became a Goodwill Ambassador in 1987. She became the first Honorary Lifetime Goodwill Ambassador in 2002, the only person to hold this title.
Angelina Jolie became a Goodwill Ambassador in 2001. In 2012 she was appointed the Special Envoy to the United Nations High Commissioner for Refugees.

Past ambassadors
 Kris Aquino
 Giorgio Armani 
 Đorđe Balašević
 Richard Burton
 Nazia Hassan
 Justus Frantz
 Udo Jürgens
 Lady Antebellum
 Sophia Loren
 Princess Märtha Louise of Norway
 James Mason
 Riccardo Muti
 Arja Saijonmaa
 The Schürzenjäger
 Jack Thompson
 Duraid Lahham

See also 
 Goodwill Ambassador
 FAO Goodwill Ambassador
 UNDP Goodwill Ambassador
 UNESCO Goodwill Ambassador
 UNODC Goodwill Ambassador
 UNFPA Goodwill Ambassador
 UNIDO Goodwill Ambassador
 UNICEF Goodwill Ambassador
 UN Women Goodwill Ambassador
 WFP Goodwill Ambassador
 WHO Goodwill Ambassador

References

External links 
UNHCR Goodwill Ambassadors

 
United_Nations_High_Commissioner_for_Refugees
Goodwill ambassador programmes
United Nations goodwill ambassadors